Murray Edgar Newman (born 18 November 1993) is a former professional Australian rules footballer who played for the West Coast Eagles in the Australian Football League (AFL).

From Perth, Western Australia, he played with the Swan Districts Football Club in the West Australian Football League (WAFL) before being drafted in the 2011 AFL National Draft. Having also represented Western Australia at the 2011 AFL Under 18 Championships, Newman has played a total of 19 games for Swan Districts. He made his senior debut for West Coast in Round 14 of the 2012 AFL season, in a game against the Gold Coast Suns at Patersons Stadium (30 June). Newman entered the game midway through the third quarter, kicking two goals in his debut.

After the 2012 season, Newman was involved in a fight outside a nightclub and was charged with causing grievous bodily harm. A few days later in two 2 kilometre training runs, Newman recorded the slowest times, even being beaten by his 44-year-old coach, John Worsfold.

He was delisted in October 2015.

Newman is an Australian Aboriginal of Yamatji and Noongar descent.

References

External links

1993 births
Australian rules footballers from Perth, Western Australia
Living people
Sportsmen from Western Australia
Swan Districts Football Club players
Indigenous Australian players of Australian rules football
People educated at Trinity College, Perth
West Coast Eagles players